Abe Rich (July 21, 1926 – November 25, 2008) was a wood craftsman and Holocaust survivor. He was inducted into the International Cuemakers Hall of Fame for the quality of the pool cue sticks he produced.

The Holocaust
Abraham Rutzisky was the son of Chaim and Hodel Rutzisky (sometimes rendered as Rutzaisky), a woodworker in Lithuania. Chaim Rutzisky was a Spundturner, making bungs for beer kegs. A secular Jew, he was well-educated and spoke Lithuanian and Polish.

In World War II, Germany invaded Lithuania (earlier absorbed by the Soviet Union) on June 22, 1941. Rutzisky was recruited by partisans because of his non-Jewish appearance, education and language skills; the partisans promised to help get his family to safety. He, however was recognized, denounced as a Jew, and shot. His wife and his youngest son, two-year-old Shlomo, were also killed during the war.

His other sons, Morris and Abe, were assigned as woodturners in the workshops established in the Kovno Ghetto (July–October 1941). These were issued two of the 5000 Jordan passes (Jordan-Scheine) given to "useful Jews" and named after the ghetto’s S.A. Hauptsturmfuehrer Fritz Jordan. The brothers were seen as valuable for their ability to make chess pieces and toys for the children of SS men.

One day, an SS officer came in to demand a repair or replacement to an ivory cigarette holder which had been a gift from his father. He struck Abe. Abe never recovered from this injury, and became a deformed hunchback, 5’ 3’’ tall as an adult. His appearance somewhat accounts for the fact that he never married. Having nearly starved to death, he suffered from chronic gastritis. Morris created a perfect replica of the cigarette holder out of cow bone. Impressed by the workmanship of the finished object, the officer declared, "Hitler lied." Until his transfer, this SS man smuggled food to the boys, which proved important to their survival.

The Kovno Ghetto was destroyed in October 1941, with 10,000 Jews being shot dead at the Ninth Fort on October 29. Approximately 3,000 of the 37,000 Jews living in Kovno survived the war, 500 of them by hiding in the forest, and 2,500 in German concentration camps.

The boys were sent to the Dachau concentration camp in Bavaria. Their woodworking skills again proved invaluable to their survival. They made clogs and canteens, and later internal scaffolding for the hangars the Germans erected to shield their aircraft from Allied reconnaissance and attack.

They were sent to the Benedictine St. Ottilien Archabbey in Landsberg to recuperate. Morris was an invaluable witness in the Dachau War Crimes trial because of his photographic memory and the length of time the brothers had spent in the ghetto. Morris personally identified the former commandant, Martin Gottfried Weiss, who was hanged on May 29, 1946.

By the time the proceedings ended, the window for Jewish refugees provided by the Truman Declaration had shut. Abe moved to Israel, where he worked in the Negev from 1948-1960 on road construction. He emigrated to the United States in 1960.

Emigration to America

From 1962 to 1965, he worked for the Rich Q company, founded by his uncle Izzy's son Sol. The company was located first in the Bowery, New York City, then later on Long Island.

Impressed with the apparent success of the enterprise, he interested his brother Morris in a similar venture. In 1965, they founded Florida Cues on 29th Street in Miami. The 4000 square foot facility, including an 800 square foot showroom, was principally dedicated to Richwood Turning. Misunderstandings developed between the brother-partners, and in 1973 Abe started a new business, Star Cues.

Abe, having worked at Rich Cue for three years, produced many pool cues at Star which bear a familial resemblance to his cousin's output. He favored Merry Widow forearms, and Brazilian Rosewood was often used, although he was also fond of more exotic materials. He stored hundreds of blanks of Goncalo Alves, Kingwood, Canadian Maple, Zebrawood and Macassar Ebony, which dried year after year under the tarpaper roof. Merry Widows formed the basis of his production, although Abe did a number of Titleist conversions. He was particularly fond of Delrin trim rings and Ivorine-3 ferrules, assembling his cues with his own, top secret epoxy blend.

Like his New York relatives, Abe did not lack for star customers at Star Cues; Minnesota Fats, Willie Mosconi, and Jackie Gleason (who played Minnesota Fats in the 1961 film The Hustler) all bought cues from him.

Sources

"Abe Rich Passes Away." Forums.AZBilliards.com. AZ Billiards. 2 Dec. 2008. Web. 29 November 2011.
Agnir, Fred. "Abe Rich: The Ultimate Survivor." InsidePool. September 2009: 37-9. Print.
Fields, Sidney. "The Man Who Cued Many a Star." New York Daily Mirror. 27 May 1963: 18. Print.
Helfgott, Stuart (Imperial USA). E-mail. 5 January 2012.
Klein, Dennis B., editor, and the United States Holocaust Memorial Museum. Hidden History of the Kovno Ghetto. Boston, MA: Little, Brown, 1997. Print.
Kovno Ghetto: A Buried History . New York: The History Channel, 1997. VHS.
Martinez, Ray. "Shooting Straight: For master craftsman Abe Rich, making world-class cues is more than a job--it’s a way of life." MiamiNewTimes.com. Miami New Times. 25 Jul. 1996. Web. 29 November 2011.
"Miami AZers-WTB Abe Rich Cue." Forums.AZBilliards.com. AZ Billiards. 5 May 2008. Web. 29 November 2011.
Mishell, William W. Kaddish for Kovno: Life and Death in a Lithuanian Ghetto. Chicago: Chicago Review Press, 1988.
"Obituary: Abe Rich." Legacy.com. The Miami Herald. 3–18 December 2008. Web. 29 November 2011.
Rich, Howard, Telephone interview. 20 July 2011.
Simpson, Brad. The Blue Book of Pool Cues. 3rd ed. Minneapolis: Blue Book Publications, 2005.
Stewart, Paul. "A Man Could Wind Up On The Bowery For The Love Of A Two-piece Billiard Cue," Sports Illustrated. 3 May 1965. 5. Print.
"A True Old World Craftsman." Narr. Tristram Korten. Under the Sun. Under the Sun. 19 Jan. 2009. Web. 29 November 2011.

1926 births
2008 deaths
Cuemakers
Dachau concentration camp survivors
Woodturners
Kovno Ghetto inmates
Lithuanian Jews
Lithuanian emigrants to Israel
Israeli emigrants to the United States
American people of Lithuanian-Jewish descent